Loděnice is a municipality and village in Beroun District in the Central Bohemian Region of the Czech Republic. It has about 2,000 inhabitants.

Administrative parts
The village of Jánská is an administrative part of Loděnice.

Geography
It lies on the border between the Křivoklát Highlands and Hořovice Uplands. The Loděnice River flows through the municipality.

History
The first written mention of Loděnice is from 1179, in the record of a battle for the Bohemian throne between dukes Soběslav II and Frederick, which took place here.

Economy
The world's largest vinyl records manufacturer, GZ Media, is located in Loděnice.

Transport

The D5 motorway passes through the municipality.
 
Loděnice lies on a railway line leading from Prague to Beroun.

Sights
The main landmark of Loděnice is the Church of Saint Wenceslaus. It was built in the Baroque style in 1726. The church tower has a Romanesque core. The rectory next to the church is a late Baroque building from the turn of the 18th and 19th centuries.

In popular culture
The 1966 Oscar-winning film Closely Watched Trains was filmed in and around the local railway station. There is a small museum dedicated to the film and to the Prague–Beroun railway line.

References

External links

Villages in the Beroun District